Albert George Ogilvie (10 March 1890 – 10 June 1939) was an Australian politician and Premier of Tasmania from 22 June 1934 until his death on 10 June 1939.

Ogilvie was the elder son of James Ogilvie. He was educated at St Patrick's College, Ballarat, Victoria, St Virgils College Hobart, and the University of Tasmania, where he graduated LL.B. in 1914. He was admitted to the bar in the same year. In 1919 he was elected to the House of Assembly for Division of Franklin, and retained the seat at each succeeding election.

In August 1921 Ogilvie successfully defended George William King, who had been accused of the murder of Chrissie Venn. In October 1923 he joined the Lyons cabinet as attorney-general and minister for education, to which was added mines and forestry in March 1924. In this year he was made a King's Counsel (KC) and was then the youngest to hold that position in Australia. In 1927 he resigned from the Lyons government and sat as a private member, but was elected leader of the opposition when Lyons went into federal politics in 1929.

He became premier without portfolio of a Labor ministry on 21 June 1934, but although he had no special department he studied all legislation closely and worked early and late at his office. He was much interested in the health of the community and advocated hospital extensions, stressed the necessity for home defence training, and realising the difficulties of the smaller states, fought hard for Tasmania at loan council meetings.

Under his premiership, school fees were abolished, health care was improved and hospitals modernised, unemployment relief as increased, hydroelectric and papermaking development was accelerated, and housing loans were provided for the needy at minimal terms. Ogilvie also worked for the establishment of the newsprint industry in Tasmania, and instituted a superannuation fund for state officials. He twice visited England during his premiership, and was present at the silver jubilee celebrations of George V in 1935, and the coronation of George VI.

He gave great attention to financial problems, and though his financial theories did not meet with general acceptance, on the whole his administration established a feeling of confidence. In June 1939 he spent a week-end at Warburton, some miles from Melbourne, being on his way to a loan council meeting at Canberra.  He took ill while playing golf and died a few hours later on 10 June. He married Dorothy Hines who survived him with a daughter. The attorney-general in his cabinet, E. J. Ogilvie, was a brother.

Legacy
The former New Town Commercial High School was renamed Ogilvie High School, in honour of the former premier, in 1940.

Family
A brother Eric James Ogilvie, served as a member of parliament at the same time Albert was premier of Tasmania.  Madeleine Ogilvie, granddaughter of Eric and great-niece of Albert, was elected to the House of Assembly for the seat of Division of Denison in 2014.

References

Sources
 Ross McMullin, The Light on the Hill: The Australian Labor Party 1891-1991

 

1890 births
1939 deaths
Australian Labor Party members of the Parliament of Tasmania
Premiers of Tasmania
Leaders of the Opposition in Tasmania
Members of the Tasmanian House of Assembly
Australian King's Counsel
20th-century Australian politicians
People educated at St Patrick's College, Ballarat
Politicians from Hobart